"Mamichula" is a song by Argentine rappers Trueno and Nicki Nicole and Argentine record producer Bizarrap. It was released on July 24, 2020. The music video for the song has more than 200 million views on YouTube. It was released as the third single from Trueno's debut album Atrevido.

Background
The song was produced by Taiu and Tatool. The music video for the song was directed by Lucas Vignale. The video of the song reached one million views in just a few hours on YouTube. The song reached number one in Argentina, Spain and several Latin American countries.

Charts

Weekly charts

Monthly charts

Year-end charts

Certifications

See also
List of Billboard Argentina Hot 100 number-one singles of 2020

References

External links
"Mamichula" music video at YouTube

2020 singles
2020 songs
Argentine songs
Bizarrap songs
Nicki Nicole songs
Song recordings produced by Bizarrap
Number-one singles in Argentina
Number-one singles in Spain
Argentina Hot 100 number-one singles
Songs written by Nicki Nicole